The Boyd massacre occurred in December 1809 when Māori of Ngāti Pou from Whangaroa Harbour in northern New Zealand killed between 66 and 70 European crew of the Boyd. Cannibalism was described or alluded to in contemporary reports.<ref>[http://nla.gov.au/nla.news-article2206419 , The Sydney Gazette and New South Wales Advertiser, 8 May 1832, retrieved 4 July 2011]</ref> This is reputedly the highest number of Europeans killed by Māori in a single event in New Zealand. 
The ship was carrying gunpowder, and in the attack, the gunpowder ignited, burning the ship down to it's copper sheathing. 

The attack was in retaliation after Te Ara, a rangatira, or chief of Ngāti Pou was wrongly accused of onboard theft and punished with the cat-o’-nine-tails while returning from Sydney. Tensions were further inflamed by a previous ship having brought disease to the local people. 

In retribution, European whalers attacked the island pa of Chief Te Pahi of Ngāpuhi about 60 km south-east, in the mistaken belief that he had ordered the killings. Between 16 and 60 Maori and one European died in the clash. News of the events delayed the first missionary visits to the country, and caused the number of shipping visits to fall to "almost nothing" over the next few years.

BackgroundBoyd was a 395-ton (bm) brigantine that had brought convicts to New South Wales and then in October 1809 sailed from Australia's Sydney Cove to Whangaroa on the east coast of New Zealand's Northland Peninsula to pick up kauri spars. The ship was under the command of Captain John Thompson and carried about 70 people.

The ship carried several passengers, including ex-convicts who had completed their transportation sentences and four or five New Zealanders who were returning to their homeland. Among the latter was Te Ara, or Tarrah, known to the crew as George, the son of a Māori chief from Whangaroa. Te Ara had spent more than a year on board different vessels that included a sealing expedition to islands in the Southern Ocean.

On the Boyd he was expected to work his passage on the ship. Some accounts state that he declined to do so because he was ill or because of his status as a chief's son.Shipwrecks and Disasters at Sea W.H.G. Kingston. George Routledge and Sons, London. 1873 Another account states that the ship's cook accidentally threw some pewter spoons overboard and accused Te Ara of stealing them to avoid being flogged himself. Alexander Berry, in a letter describing the events, said: "The captain had been rather too hasty in resenting some slight theft."

Whatever the reason, the result was that the captain deprived him of food and had him tied to a capstan and whipped with a cat-o'-nine-tails.

This treatment of Te Ara prompted him to seek utu, or revenge. Te Ara regained the confidence of the captain and persuaded him to put into Whangaroa Bay, assuring him that it was the best place to secure the timber he desired.

Upon reaching Whangaroa, Te Ara reported his indignities to his tribe and displayed the whip marks on his back. In accordance with Māori customs, they formed a plan for utu. Under British law, whipping was the common punishment for minor crimes – a British person could be legally hanged for stealing goods to the value of five shillings. In Māori culture, however, the son of a chief was a privileged figure who did not bow to an outsider's authority. Physical punishment of his son caused the chief to suffer a loss of face (or "mana"), and to Māori this warranted a violent retribution.

Killings
Three days after Boyd's arrival, the Māori invited Captain Thompson to follow their canoes to find suitable kauri trees. Thompson, his chief officer and three others followed the canoes to the entrance of the Kaeo River. The remaining crew stayed aboard with the passengers, preparing the vessel for the voyage to Britain.

When the boats were out of sight of Boyd, the Māori attacked the five pākehā (foreigners), killing them all with clubs and axes. The Māori stripped the clothes from the victims and a group donned them to disguise themselves as Europeans. Another group carried the bodies to their pā (village) to be eaten.

At dusk the disguised group manned the longboat, and at nightfall they slipped alongside the Boyd and were greeted by the crew. Other Māori canoes awaited the signal to attack. The first to die was a ship's officer: the attackers then crept around the deck, stealthily killing all the crew. The passengers were called to the deck and then killed and dismembered. Five people hid up the mast among the rigging, where they witnessed the events.

The next morning the survivors saw a large canoe carrying chief Te Pahi from the Bay of Islands enter the harbour. The chief had come to the area to trade with the Whangaroa Māori. The Europeans called out to Te Pahi's canoe for help. After Te Pahi had gathered the survivors from the Boyd, they headed for shore. But two Whangaroa canoes pursued them. As the survivors fled along the beach, Te Pahi watched as the pursuers caught and killed all but one.

European survivors

Five people were spared in the massacre: Ann Morley and her baby, in a cabin; apprentice Thomas Davis (or Davison), hidden in the hold; the second mate; and two-year-old Elizabeth "Betsey" Broughton, taken by a local chief who put a feather in her hair and kept her for three weeks before she was rescued. The second mate was killed and eaten when his usefulness in making fish-hooks was exhausted.

Boyds destruction
The Whangaroa Māori towed Boyd towards their village until it grounded on mudflats near Motu Wai (Red Island). They spent several days ransacking the ship, tossing flour, salt pork, and bottled wine overboard. The Māori were interested in a large cache of muskets and gunpowder.

About 20 Māori smashed barrels of gunpowder and attempted to make the muskets functional. Chief Piopio sparked a flint. This ignited the gunpowder, causing a massive explosion that killed him and nine other Māori instantly. A fire then swept the ship igniting its cargo of whale oil. Soon all that was left of Boyd was a burnt-out sunken hull. Māori declared the hull tapu, sacred or prohibited.

Rescue
When news of the massacre reached European settlements, Captain Alexander Berry undertook a rescue mission aboard . Berry rescued the four remaining survivors: Ann Morley and her baby, Thomas Davis (or Davison), and Betsy Broughton.

The City of Edinburgh crew found piles of human bones on the shoreline, with many evincing cannibalism.

Captain Berry captured two Māori chiefs responsible for the massacre, at first holding them for ransom for the return of survivors. After the survivors were returned, Berry told the chiefs that they would be taken to Europe to answer for their crimes unless they released the Boyd's papers. After the papers were given to him, he released the chiefs. He made it a condition of their release that they would be "degraded from their rank, and received among the number of his slaves", although he never expected this condition to be complied with.
They expressed gratitude for the mercy. Berry's gesture avoided further bloodshed, an inevitability had the chiefs been executed.

The four people rescued were taken on board Berry's ship bound for the Cape of Good Hope. However, the ship encountered storms and was damaged, and after repairs arrived in Lima, Peru. Mrs Morley died while in Lima.
He drowned while exploring the entrance to the Shoalhaven River with Berry in 1822.
Mrs Morley's child and Betsy Broughton were taken onwards by Berry to Rio de Janeiro, from where they returned to Sydney in May 1812 aboard .
Betsy Broughton married Charles Throsby, nephew of the explorer Charles Throsby, and died in 1891.

Aftermath
In March 1810, sailors from five whaling ships (Diana, Experiment, Perseverance, Speke, and ) launched a revenge attack. Their target was the pa on Motu Apo island in Wairoa Bay belonging to Te Pahi, the chief who tried to rescue the Boyd survivors and then saw them killed. Te Pahi had later accepted one of the Boyd's small boats and some other booty, and his name was confused with that of Te Puhi, who was one of the plotters of the massacre. This was the belief of Samuel Marsden, the prominent early missionary who said it was Te Ara (George) and his brother Te Puhi who took Boyd as revenge. In the attack between 16 and 60 Māori and one sailor were killed.

Te Pahi, who was wounded in the neck and chest, realised that the sailors had attacked him because of the actions of the Whangaroa Maori. Some time before 28 April, he gathered his remaining warriors and attacked Whangaroa, where he was killed by a spear thrust.

News of the Boyd Massacre reached Australia and Europe, delaying a planned visit of missionaries until 1814. A notice was printed and circulated in Europe advising against visiting "that cursed shore" of New Zealand, at the risk of being eaten by cannibals.

Shipping to New Zealand "fell away to almost nothing" during the next three years.

Cultural references
Details of the massacre have featured in many non-fiction publications. One of the most comprehensive was:
 The Burning of the 'Boyd' - A Saga of Culture Clash (1984), Wade Doak

The massacre was the subject of a 2010 New Zealand children's book:
 The Shadow of the Boyd, by Diana Menefy

Historical fiction references include:
 The Boyd Massacre: The true and terrible story of, (2005), Ian Macdonald (a descendant of Boyd survivor Betsey Broughton)
 Burning the Evidence by Terri Kessell, follows Ann Morley, who lived with Maori for some months before her rescue by Alexander Berry

The massacre has also featured in several paintings:
 , The Boyd Incident, (1839)
 Louis John Steele, The Blowing Up of the Boyd, (1889)
 Walter Wright,  The Burning of the Boyd, (1908)

See also
List of massacres in New Zealand

References

A comprehensive report by Tony Flude
"BOYD", MASSACRE OF, from An Encyclopaedia of New Zealand, edited by A. H. McLintock, 1966. Te Ara - The Encyclopedia of New Zealand, updated 18 September 2007.
The Massacre of the Boyd, 1809 and 1810 and After the Massacre, 1810 to 1814, Chapters 10 and 11 in From Tasman To Marsden: A History of Northern New Zealand from 1642 to 1818, by Robert McNab. Published by J. Wilkie & Company, Dunedin, 1914.
Massacre of the Boyd, in Chapter 1, in Christianity Among The New Zealanders'', by the Right Rev. William Williams, D.C.L., Bishop of Waiapu. Seeley, Jackson, and Halliday, London, 1867.

External links
Depiction of the capture of the Boyd in Whangaroa Harbour, Louis Auguste Sainson, 1840s?.
The Burning of the Boyd, oil painting by Walter Wright, 1908.

Conflicts in 1809
Massacres in 1809
Cannibalism in Oceania
Massacres in New Zealand
1809 in New Zealand
Far North District
Maritime history of New Zealand
History of the Northland Region
December 1809 events
Maritime incidents in 1809
1809 murders in Oceania
Incidents of cannibalism